Lejonen (the Lions) is a motorcycle speedway club from Gislaved in Sweden, who compete in the Elitserien. Their home track is at the OnePartnerGroup Arena which is Sweden's oldest track still in use. The club are two times champions of Sweden.

History
In December 1929 Gislaved Motorclub was formed and by 1931 the track was built. In 1963, Smålands Lejon began racing in Division Three, becoming Lejonen the following season in 1964. They became the champions in 1965. Lejonen finished at the top of Division Two (the Allsvenskan) in 2007 and defeated Valsarna in the play-off final to gain promotion to the Elitserien for 2008.

During the winter of 2007-08 the track underwent major changes to accommodate Elitserien racing and the club announced the signing of Nicki Pedersen, the 2007 World Champion.

The club became champions of Sweden for two successive years in 2008 and 2009 after they won the Swedish Speedway Team Championship.

Smålänningarna and Team Dalej
Smålänningarna compete in the Allsvenskan and Team Dalej compete in the third tier (division 1), they are a collaboration between Dackarna and Lejonen allowing less senior riders the opportunity to race. The collaboration started in 2020 and the Smålänningarna name came from and old team that had riders from Småland.

Season summary

Teams

2023 team

Previous teams

2017 team

 
 
 
 
 

2022 team

References 

Swedish speedway teams
Sport in Jönköping County